Aalto University is an underground station on the western metro extension (Länsimetro) of the Helsinki Metro. It is located inside the Otaniemi campus of Aalto University. The station is located 1,7 kilometres northeast from Tapiola metro station and 1,4 kilometres northwest from Keilaniemi metro station.

References

External links
Länsimetro work in progress

 

Helsinki Metro stations
2017 establishments in Finland